Chico (also Valley Maidu) is an extinct Maiduan language formerly spoken by Maidu peoples who lived in Northern California, between Sacramento and the Sierra foothills.

See also

 Maidu
 Maiduan languages

Bibliography

 Campbell, Lyle. (1997). American Indian languages: The historical linguistics of Native America. New York: Oxford University Press. .
 Heizer, Robert F. (1966). Languages, territories, and names of California Indian tribes.
 Mithun, Marianne. (1999). The languages of Native North America. Cambridge: Cambridge University Press.  (hbk); .

References

External links
 OLAC resources in and about the Valley Maidu language

Maiduan languages
Indigenous languages of California
Extinct languages of North America